Josef Vinklář (10 November 1930, in Podůlší – 18 September 2007, in Prague) was a Czech actor, a member of the National Theatre. He was married to Czech actress Jana Dítětová.

Biography 
Born 10 November 1939, but when in 1946 the pastor exhibited a duplicate birth certificate and wrong date of birth of his and his brother and an incorrect date of birth of 14 November.

After graduating from junior secondary school, he joined a one-year learning course (1945) and simultaneously began acting in children's radio Dismanova file. Already in 1945, was a guest speaker at the Theatre of Satire and played there in the season 1945/1946. In the years 1946–1948 he was engaged in theatres Jan Werich Voskovec and Werich, then worked in Pardubice East Bohemia Theatre (1948–1950).

From August 1950 until July 1983 he has created a number of dramatic roles in Prague Realistic Theatre of Zdeněk Nejedlý (with the exception of the years 1951 to 1953, when he graduated from basic military service). Between 1981 and 1983, he hosted at the National Theatre and 1 August 1983 he became a full member of the drama. Then, as a guest at various theaters, e.g. In the Theatre in 1996, in a game of Friedrich Dürrenmatt Visit of the Old Lady (Czech: Návštěva staré dámy).

Selected filmography

Nezbedný bakalár (1946) - Martínek
Predtucha (1947) - Václav Jelínek
Nikola Suhaj (1947) - Herdsman
Az se vrátís (1948) - Boy on Motorcycle
Vítezná kridla (1951) - Vláda
Mladá láska (1954) - Jirka
Dnes vecer vsechno skoncí (1955) - Milan Pazdera
Větrná hora (1956) - Antonín Homolka
The Unconquered (1956) - Pvt. Mirek
Silvery Wind (1956) - Valenta
Hrátky s certem (1957) - Lucius
Roztrzka (1958) - A Man Dancing in the Bar
Rocník 21 (1958) - Olin
Cesta zpátky (1959) - Dan Cihák
105 % alibi (1959) - Jirka Broz, Karluv kamarád
The Princess with the Golden Star (1959) - Cookie Janek
Smyk (1960) - Kubes
Policejní hodina (1961) - Werner
Pohled do ocí (1961) - Petr Valenta
Zámek pro Barborku (1963) - Karel Poustka
Transport from Paradise (1963) - Vágus
The Fifth Horseman Is Fear (1965) - velitel civilní obrany Vlastimil Fanta
Atentát (1965) - rotný Karel Vrbas
Transit Carlsbad (1966) - Carter
Královský omyl (1968) - Heidenreich
Dábelské líbánky (1970) - Police Officer
Penicka a Paraplícko (1971) - inspektor Josef Bouse
Partie krásného dragouna (1971) - inspektor Josef Bouse
Vrazda v hotelu Excelsior (1971) - inspektor Josef Bouse
The Death of Black King (1972) - inspektor Josef Bouse
Oáza (1972) - Nowak
Kronika zhavého léta (1973) - Filip Tymes
Jakou barvu má láska (1974) - Mácha (voice)
Tam, kde hnízdí čápi (1975) - Fabián
Všichni proti všem (1977) - Dedara
Hop – a je tu lidoop (1978) - Butcher Turecek
Zrcadleni (1978) - Viktor
Stopar (1978) - Jirí Dusek
Pod Jezevci skalou (1978) - lesní delník zvaný Hromotluk
Pumpari od Zlaté podkovy (1979) - Vávra
Skandál v Gri-Gri baru (1979) - séfredaktor Práva lidu Foltýn
Tajemství Ocelového mesta (1979) - Profesor chemie Eric Janus
Vrazedné pochybnosti (1979) - Capt. Kolousek
Pan Vok odchází (1979) - Simon
Concert at the End of Summer (1980) - Antonín Dvorák
Pátek není svátek (1980) - Masér
Kdo prichází pred pulnocí (1980) - recidivista Roman Kratochvíl
Tajemství dáblovy kapsy (1980) - Stockinger
Hra o královnu (1981) - Milota of Dedice
Ta chvíle, ten okamžik (1981) - Novák
V podstate jsme normální (1981) - masseur Zdenek Beznoska
Kazdému jeho nebe (1981) - séf cinohry Národního divadla dr. Pilar
Hadí jed (1981) - Jan Veselý
Malý velký hokejista (1982) - Hájek
Má láska s Jakubem (1982) - Tomsovský
Sileny kankan (1983) - halicský smelinár Milan Scholef
Andel s dáblem v tele (1984) - poslanec Rudolf Nikodým
Atomová katedrála (1985) - Chairman Milý
Polocas stestí (1985) - Ondrej Bozdech
Tisnove volani (1985) - porucík Josef Kabát
Mravenci nesou smrt (1986) - podplukovnik VB Korán
Velká filmová loupez (1986)
Dva na koni, jeden na oslu (1987) - Mátoha
Pesti ve tme (1987) - Krakowski
Evropa tancila valcik (1989) - Franz Ferdinand d'Este
Kanarska spojka (1993) - Aron
Jak chutná smrt (1995) - Vlach
Das Zauberbuch (1996) - King (voice)
Pasáz (1997) - Krystof
Polojasno (1999)
Isabela, vévodkyne Bourbonská (1999) - Karel IV
Cizinci v case (2000)
Andělská tvář (2002) - Judge Pinaud
Lesní chodci (2003) - Investigator
The Red Baron (2008) - Paul von Hindenburg (final film role)

References

External links 

1930 births
2007 deaths
Czech male stage actors
Czech male film actors
Czech male television actors
Merited Artists of Czechoslovakia
People from Jičín District
Male actors from Prague
Deaths from cancer in the Czech Republic
Deaths from lung cancer